Kilian Caspar Flasch (July 16, 1831 – August 3, 1891) was a German-born prelate of the Roman Catholic Church who served as bishop of the Diocese of La Crosse in Wisconsin from 1881 until his death in 1891.

Biography

Early life and education
Kilian Flasch was born at Retzstadt, in the Main-Spessart district of the Kingdom of Bavaria (now part of Germany) to Andreas and Anna Margareta (née Giesuebel) Flasch. One of ten children, he was his parents' fourth child and second son; he was the only son who survived infancy. He was raised on his family's farm and received his early education at neighboring schools. In 1847, his family sold their farm and immigrated to the United States, settling in Fond du Lac, Wisconsin.

Flasch entered the College of Notre Dame in South Bend, Indiana, and continued his studies at St. Vincent Seminary in Latrobe, Pennsylvania. In 1856, he returned to Wisconsin and enrolled at the newly opened St. Francis Seminary in Milwaukee. He completed his studies at St. Francis, where he was a member of the first graduating class.

Priesthood and ministry
Flasch was ordained to the priesthood for the Archdiocese of Milwaukee by Bishop John Henni on December 16, 1859. He celebrated his first mass at the chapel of the School Sisters of Notre Dame, of which three of his sisters were members, in Milwaukee the following Sunday. Flasch's first assignment was as pastor of St. Stephen Parish in New Coeln, Wisconsin, which included the mission of St. James Church in Oak Creek, Wisconsin. From 1860 to 1863, he served as the first resident pastor of St. Louis Church in Caledonia.

In October 1860, Flasch was appointed professor of moral theology and master of discipline at St. Francis Seminary. He remained at the seminary until the spring of 1865, when he became a chaplain and instructor at a convent of the Franciscan Sisters of Perpetual Adoration in Jefferson, Wisconsin due to ill health. Flasch briefly resumed his duties at the seminary before being named pastor of St. Mary's Visitation Parish in Elm Grove, Wisconsin in May 1867. During his seven-year tenure, he constructed a new church building and rectory, and ministered to an orphanage. He returned to St. Francis Seminary in November 1874, where he resumed his post as professor of moral theology in addition to becoming spiritual director. From 1879 to 1881, Flasch served as rector of the seminary.

Bishop of La Crosse
On June 14, 1881, Flasch was appointed the second bishop of the Diocese of La Crosse by Pope Leo XIII. He received his episcopal consecration on August 24, 1881, from Archbishop Michael Heiss, with Bishops Francis Krautbauer and Rupert Seidenbusch serving as co-consecrators, at the chapel of St. Francis Seminary. He was installed on September 1.

Flasch made his first ad limina visit to Rome in 1883. He attended the Third Plenary Council of Baltimore in 1884, serving as a member of the Committee on Schools. An outspoken supporter of Catholic education, he established 36 new schools during his tenure and, at the Plenary Council, unsuccessfully sought to require Catholic parents to send their children to parochial schools. However, he originally opposed creating a national Catholic university but later served on the Board of Trustees for the Catholic University of America. He presided over the second diocesan synod of La Crosse in 1887, and created over 60 new parishes.

Because of his poor health, Flasch traveled to Chatawa, Mississippi, in March 1891 to recuperate. The trip proved unsuccessful and Kilian Flasch returned to La Crosse, where he died on August 3, 1891, at age 60. He was originally buried in the Catholic Cemetery Chapel, but his remains were later transferred to the Cathedral of St. Joseph the Workman in LaCrosse.

See also

 Catholic Church hierarchy
 Catholic Church in the United States
 Historical list of the Catholic bishops of the United States
 List of Catholic bishops of the United States
 Lists of patriarchs, archbishops, and bishops

References

External links
Roman Catholic Diocese of La Crosse

German Roman Catholic bishops in North America
People from La Crosse, Wisconsin
19th-century Roman Catholic bishops in the United States
Roman Catholic bishops of La Crosse
University of Notre Dame alumni
Catholic University of America trustees
1837 births
1891 deaths
People from Elm Grove, Wisconsin
People from Fond du Lac, Wisconsin